Centro Digital Pictures Limited was a visual special effects and animation company based in Hong Kong that provided visual effects for film, interactive media, and video games.

History
Centro Digital Pictures was founded by John Chu in 1985. Centro (先濤) began as a post-production house for Hong Kong commercials in the mid-1980s. In 1998, Centro decided to co-produce The Storm Riders, a film directed by Andrew Lau. Centro then co-produced, "A Man Called Hero" based on the manhua Chinese Hero. They also provided visual effects for Kill Bill, for which they received a BAFTA nomination. Centro also produced visual effects for Kung Fu Hustle. The company also performed contract work for video game company Ubisoft on the titles 187 Ride or Die and Splinter Cell. In 2012, Centro became a wholly owned subsidiary of the Deluxe Entertainment Services Group. In 2015, the company went offline, and it closed in 2018.

Special effects filmography
 Metallic Attraction: Kung Fu Cyborg (ji qi xia, directed by Jeffrey Lau, 2009)
 City of Life and Death (Nánjīng! Nánjīng!, directed by Lu Chuan, 2009)
 Gegege no Kitarô 2 (directed by Katsuhide Motoki, 2008)
 Run Papa Run (Yat kor ho ba ba, directed by Sylvia Chang, 2008)
 The Secret of the Magic Gourd (Baohulu de mimi, directed by Frankie Chung and John Chu, 2007)
 Curse of the Golden Flower (Man cheng jin dai huang jin jia, directed by Zhang Yimou, 2006)
 The Promise (Wu Ji, directed by Chen Kaige, 2005)
 Kung Fu Hustle (Gong fu, directed by Stephen Chow, 2004)
 Kill Bill volume 2 (directed by Quentin Tarantino, 2004)
 Kill Bill volume 1 (directed by Quentin Tarantino, 2003)
 The Eye (Gin gwai, directed by The Pang Brothers, 2002)
 Chinese Odyssey 2002  (Tian xia wu shuang, directed by Jeffrey Lau, 2002)
 Shaolin Soccer (Siu lam juk kau, directed by Stephen Chow, 2001)
 Bangkok Dangerous  (directed by the Pang Brothers, 1999)
 A Man Called Hero (Zhong hua ying xiong, directed by Andrew Lau, 1999), based on the manhua Chinese Hero
 The Storm Riders (directed by Andrew Lau, 1999)
 Waan ying dak gung (directed by Ma Chu Cheng, 1998)
 Boli zhi cheng (directed by Mabel Cheung, 1998)
 The Emperor and the Assassin (Jing ke ci qin wang, directed by Chen Kaige, 1998)
 The Storm Riders (Fung wan: Hung ba tin ha, directed by Andrew Lau 1998)
 The Soong Sisters (Song jia huang chao, directed by Mabel Cheung, 1997)
 Legend of Mad Phoenix (Naam hoi sap saam long, directed by Clifton Ko, 1997)
 Ta fa likit (directed by the Pang Brothers, 1997)
 The Emperor's Shadow (Qin song, directed by Xiaowen Zhou, 1996)
 Lost and Found (Tian ya hai jiao, directed by Chi-Ngai Lee, 1996)
 Thanks for Your Love (½ Chi tung chong, directed by Norman Law, 1996)
 Police Story 4: First Strike (Jing cha gu shi 4: Zhi jian dan ren wu, directed by Jackie Chan, 1996)
 The Umbrella Story (Ren jian you qing, directed by Clifton Ko, 1995)

Awards

Wins
Centro has been recognized with awards from many top industry organizations. So far Gong fu (Kung Fu Hustle) has been their most successful film, and has won a Hong Kong Film Award a Golden Horse Film Festival award and a Satellite Award. In 2002 they won a Golden Horse Award in Best Visual Effects for Gin gwai (The Eye).

Nominations
They have also been nominated for Hong Kong Film Awards in the area of Sound Design for Zhong hua ying xiong (A Man Called Hero), a BAFTA Award for Visual Effects due to their work on Kill Bill volumes 1 & 2, and a Hong Kong Film Award in Visual Effects for Man cheng jin dai huang jin jia (Curse of the Golden Flower).

References

External links
Centro Digital Pictures Ltd. Official site

Film production companies of China
Hong Kong animation studios
Computer animation
Special effects companies
Visual effects companies
Entertainment companies established in 1985
Privately held companies of China
Film and video technology
Digital media